Chapman USD 473 is a public unified school district headquartered in Chapman, Kansas, United States.  The district includes the communities of Chapman, Acme, Carlton, Detroit, Enterprise, Industry (south of 1st Rd), Lyona, Manchester, Navarre, Pearl, Wreford, Buckeye, Elmo, Holland, Moonlight, Upland, and nearby rural areas.

Schools
The school district operates the following schools:
 Chapman High School in Chapman
 Chapman Middle School in Chapman
 Chapman Elementary in Chapman
 Blue Ridge Elementary is located northwest of Chapman in a rural area along K-18 Highway
 Enterprise Elementary in Enterprise
 Rural Center Elementary is located south of Abilene in a rural area along K-15 Highway

See also
 Kansas State Department of Education
 Kansas State High School Activities Association
 List of high schools in Kansas
 List of unified school districts in Kansas

References

External links
 

School districts in Kansas
Education in Dickinson County, Kansas